The Spain national rugby union team (Spanish:  Selección de rugby de España), nicknamed Los Leones (The Lions), represents Spain in men's international rugby union competitions. The team is administered by the Spanish Rugby Federation. The team annually takes part in the European Nations Cup, the highest European rugby championship outside the Six Nations. The national side is ranked 15th in the world (as of 4 August 2022).

Rugby union in Spain dates back to 1901, although Spain did not play its first international until 1929, beating Italy 9–0 in Barcelona. Throughout the century, Spain mostly played against other European opponents such as France, Italy, Romania, West Germany, the Soviet Union, and Portugal. The team's greatest moment of success came in 1999, when Spain qualified for the 1999 Rugby World Cup. Despite being whitewashed, the team performed admirably in a group which included South Africa and Scotland.

Today, Spain competes in the European Nations Cup against Georgia, Germany, Portugal, Romania, and Russia. Spain has never been crowned European champions, though has come close. The closest they've come to becoming European champions was in 2012, having beaten both Romania and Georgia and finishing second. Many players have moved abroad to play professionally in France, in hopes of qualifying for the 2019 or possibly expanded 2023 editions of the World Cup.

History

Early history and amateur era
The exact starting point of rugby union in Spain is unknown; Catalan student Baldiri Aleu introduced the game from France to a mainstream Spanish audience in 1921, but the game might have been played on Spanish soil earlier. Through the 1920s, the game gradually gained popularity through universities in the country. The first Copa del Rey de Rugby was organized in 1926, and won by Barcelona. An unofficial Spanish XV played France, including Yves du Manoir, in 1927, but it was organised by a rebel governing body.

Spain played their first officially recognised match in 1929, winning 9–0 over Italy in the Estadi Olímpic de Montjuïc. During the 1930s the Spanish rugby team played sporadically in the 1930s, playing against the national teams of Italy, Morocco, Germany, and Portugal. Due to the outbreak of World War II, rugby in much of Europe was suspended, and this included Spain. Rugby operations throughout Europe were continued in the 1950s; through this decade the Spanish struggled to the likes of West Germany, Italy and Romania. This pattern of consistency continued somewhat in the 1960s and 1970s; Spain traditionally struggled versus more established opponents such as Romania and Italy, but beat other neighboring sides such as Portugal and Morocco. However, while no official games were played between Spain and the Home Nations or the SANZAR, some Spanish sides traveled to play against various foreign sides.

The 1980s proved to be somewhat of a golden age for Spanish rugby; for the first time Spain played against non-FIRA competition, playing a test against both the Māori All Blacks as well as South American giants Argentina in November 1982, in Madrid. The Spanish were thrashed 66–3 to the Māori, but came close to upsetting Argentina, losing only 28 to 19. The Spanish also received Zimbabwe through various tests in the 80s. The Spanish recorded upsets, defeating Zimbabwe in Harare in 1984, winning 30–18.

World Cup begins (1987–2009)
Even more impressive, the Spanish swept a two-game tour in Zimbabwe, a team that had appeared in the 1987 Rugby World Cup, winning 28–16 and 14–9 in Bulawayo and Harare. Other notable results in this period included beating Uruguay 18–6, as well as giving scares to the sides of England and Scotland, and coming within 10 points of beating the Māori in 1988. By the end of the 80s, Spain was considered one of the best non-5 Nations teams in Europe, just barely behind Romania, Italy, and the Soviet Union. Spain officially joined the IRB in 1987, after not being invited for the 1987 Rugby World Cup, despite the USSR declining an invitation.

The 1990s provided a mixed fortune of both near misses and eventual success. In the 1991 qualifying rounds, Spain easily toppled its first group consisting of the Netherlands, Poland and Belgium, all games being played at home. However, Spain very narrowly missed on qualifying for the Rugby World Cup, losing 19–6 against Romania, finishing third behind Italy and Romania. In 1992, Spain finally beat Romania for the first time in 1992, winning 6–0. Spain again nearly beat Argentina that same year, only losing 43–34 in a shootout in Madrid.

1995 began in similar fashion to the 1991 campaign, easily toppling the first group. However, Spain were unfortunately placed in a group with Wales, losing the key fixture 54–0, and again coming close, yet not close enough.

Spain began their quest for 1999 Rugby World Cup qualification in Pool 3 of Round B of the European qualification. They won all four of their games in the round, finishing first in the group above Portugal. They, along with Portugal advanced to the next pool round with Scotland. They finished second and qualified for their first Rugby World Cup.

For the 1999 Rugby World Cup, Spain were in Pool A, along with Scotland, South Africa and Uruguay. Their first ever World Cup game was played against Uruguay, with Spain losing 27–15. They lost their subsequent pool games to Scotland and the Springboks by 40 points, both of which were played at Murrayfield. They failed to score a try in the tournament, the only team in the World to have qualified but not scored a try in the World cup.

Spain began 2003 Rugby World Cup qualifying games in May 2002. Spain advanced to Round 3 after defeating Portugal. However, they lost to both Italy and Romania, and moved through to face Russia for a place in the repechage competition. Despite losing the first game in Madrid 3–36, and looking dead in the water, Spain pulled off a very unlikely victory, winning 38–22. Despite losing on aggregate, Spain went through the repechage due to Russia being disqualified for fielding ineligible players. They defeated Tunisia and moved on to face the United States. Spain lost 62–13 and 58–13, again missing out on the World Cup.

For the 2007 Rugby World Cup, Spain finished at the top of Pool A or Round 2 of the European qualification and advanced to Round 3 where they went into Pool A. Here they won all four fixtures to finish  at the top and advance to the play-off. There they faced Germany, and although they lost the first game, they won the second and went through on a 42–28 aggregate and went into Round 4 where they defeated the Czech Republic to enter Round 5. However they lost out to Romania and Georgia in Pool B, ending their hopes of reaching the World Cup in France.

2010–present

Spain missed the qualification for the 2011 Rugby World Cup in New Zealand, this time struggling through their fixtures. They lost 8 of their 10 fixtures, beating only Germany those two times, and missed out on advancing to the next round of qualifying.

Spain entered the top 20 in the IRB ranking in February 2013 for the first time following a 25–18 win over the higher ranked Georgia making headlines with semi-pro back Jack Rowland making a surprising call up, due to both fly-half and first team inside center pulling out with injury moments before the squad was announces. Rowland a last moment replacement scoring 12 out of the 25 points on his international debut. Surprising ranked Georgia first time in 29 years with a victory. Spain remained in the top 20 throughout the year, ending 2013 ranked 19th. Despite this, the 2015 campaign was similarly disastrous, winning only two of their games as well as two draws. This led to a restructure of the makeup and strategies of the FER. Spain has recently participated in the World Rugby Nations Cup and the 2014 IRB Tbilisi Cup.

The 2019 qualifying saw the team markedly improve; in 2017 they beat Germany, Russia and Belgium, and lost narrowly to Romania at home. The Spaniards started 2018 with great fortune, as they defeated Russia on their home soil for the first time since 2002, and defeated Romania for the first time since 2012. With both of these victories, Spain led their qualifying group and looked set for a possible qualification at the 2019 Rugby World Cup, but a controversial defeat at Belgium in the last round, and a heavy deduction of points because of fielding of illegible players, ended their hopes.

Strip
Historically, Spain's kit reflected the colours of Spain; a red jersey with blue shorts deriving from the House of Bourbon. The current home kit consists of a red shirt with a triangular pattern and black on the waist sides, dark blue shorts and dark blue socks, while the away kit consists of a dark blue jersey, red waist sides, dark blue shorts and dark blue socks; previously, during the 1980s and 1990s, the Spanish team wore a yellow top as away kit.

In 2013, it was announced that O'Neills, one of Ireland's most notable sporting brands, would be providing the new kits for Spain. This partnership is expected to last for the rest of the decade. The team has been previously sponsored by Iberia, Orange and Renfe, and previous kit providers include Canterbury, Westport, Viator, Kondy Sport and Puma.

Currently, the kits are provided by Joma since 2016. Since 2017, Generali is the current sponsor.

Record

European Nations Cup & FIRA Trophy

Note: Green signifies promotion; red signifies relegation. Italic signifies current competition.

Rugby World Cup record

Overall

Below is a table of the representative rugby matches played by a Spain national XV at test level up until 4 November 2022.

Players

Current squad
On the 26 October, the following 32 players were called up for the 2022 end-of-year rugby union internationals.

Head Coach:  Santiago Santos
 Caps Updated: 6 November 2022

Notable former players
 Alberto Malo (1986–1999) – 89 caps
 Francisco Puertas Soto (1994–2001) – 93 caps
 César Sempere (2004–2014) – 56 caps, 31 tries, 177 points
 Pablo Feijoo (2002–2015) – 67 caps, 20 tries
 Esteban Roqué Segovia (2004–2007) – 22 caps, 285 points
 Oriol Ripol (1998–2002) – 17 caps, played 8 seasons in English Premiership
 Diego Zarzosa (1998–2009) – 46 caps
 Cédric Garcia (2004) – 3 caps, played 12 seasons in the French Top 14

Coaches

Current coaching staff
The current coaching staff of the Spanish national team:

Former coaches

See also
 Spain national rugby sevens team
 Spain women's national rugby union team
 Spain women's national rugby sevens team
 Rugby union in Spain

External links

  
 Spain at RugbyData.com

References

 
European national rugby union teams
Rugby union in Spain
Teams in European Nations Cup (rugby union)